The School Games (formerly known as UK School Games) is an annual sporting competition for elite school-age athletes in the United Kingdom that began in 2006.

The event was based on an Olympic Games model, with multiple sports events held across an intensive four-day period.  The Games were organised by the Youth Sport Trust, sponsored by Sainsbury's,  and from 2008 received funding from Legacy Trust UK, a charitable trust set up to ensure that the 2012 Summer Olympics generate a lasting legacy across the UK.

In 2011, 1,600 elite school-aged athletes participated in the event across twelve sports: athletics, badminton, cycling, fencing, gymnastics, hockey, judo, rugby sevens, swimming, table tennis, volleyball, and wheelchair basketball.

Locations

UK School Games
 2006 — Glasgow
 2007 — Coventry
 2008 — South West England (Bristol and Bath)
 2009 — Wales (Cardiff, Newport and Swansea)
 2010 — North East England (Newcastle, Gateshead and Sunderland)
 2011 — Sheffield

School Games
 2012 — London
 2013 — Sheffield
 2014 — Manchester
 2015 — Manchester
 2016 — Loughborough
 2017 — Loughborough

Changes in 2012

Name change
Following the 2011 UK School Games, the event changed its name to the School Games.

Format change
The structure of the event also changed from previous years.  The UK School Games was an annual event for the most talented school-age athletes, whereas the new School Games is a year-round, inclusive sports competition that’s designed to get young people of all ages and abilities enjoying the benefits of competitive sport.  There is a new pyramid structure in place and school-aged pupils will compete at four levels: 
 Level 1 – Intra-school competition
 Level 2 – Local inter-school competition
 Level 3 – Annual area school games festival
 Level 4 – National multi-sport event
The number of sports involved in the games will also increase to around 30.

2012 School Games
The 2012 School Games started in September 2011 and culminated in the national event being held in May 2012 in London.  The four-day national event took place across a range of sporting venues around London, with the final day of action set in the Olympic Park in Stratford using some key Olympic 2012 venues, including the main stadium.

See also
2012 Summer Olympics 
2012 Paralympic Games
Youth Olympic Games
Commonwealth Youth Games

References

External links
UK School Games website for the current year
Your School Games website

Loughborough Sport
Organisations based in Leicestershire
Recurring sporting events established in 2006
School sport in the United Kingdom
2006 establishments in the United Kingdom
2011 disestablishments in the United Kingdom
Sport in Loughborough